Émerson Luiz Firmino or simply Émerson (born 28 July 1973 in Campinas) is a Brazilian former professional footballer who played as a striker.

Personal life
He lives in Germany with his wife.

References

External links
 
 
 
 湘南ベルマーレ（ベルマーレ平塚） 
 

1973 births
Living people
Brazilian footballers
Association football forwards
Hamburger SV players
Hamburger SV II players
FC Dnipro players
Holstein Kiel players
FC St. Pauli players
Grêmio Foot-Ball Porto Alegrense players
MVV Maastricht players
KFC Uerdingen 05 players
Tianjin Jinmen Tiger F.C. players
1. FC Union Berlin players
Club América footballers
Hapoel Petah Tikva F.C. players
Real C.D. España players
Qatar SC players
Bundesliga players
Ukrainian Premier League players
J1 League players
Israeli Premier League players
Shonan Bellmare players
Liga Nacional de Fútbol Profesional de Honduras players
Brazilian expatriate footballers
Expatriate footballers in Honduras
Expatriate footballers in Israel
Expatriate footballers in Mexico
Expatriate footballers in Germany
Expatriate footballers in Ukraine
Expatriate footballers in the Netherlands
Expatriate footballers in Qatar
Expatriate footballers in China
Expatriate footballers in Japan
Brazilian expatriate sportspeople in Honduras
Brazilian expatriate sportspeople in Israel
Brazilian expatriate sportspeople in Mexico
Brazilian expatriate sportspeople in Germany
Brazilian expatriate sportspeople in Ukraine
Brazilian expatriate sportspeople in the Netherlands
Brazilian expatriate sportspeople in Qatar
Brazilian expatriate sportspeople in China
Brazilian expatriate sportspeople in Japan
Sportspeople from Campinas